Jan Thorstensen (28 May 1933 – 20 August 2014) was a Norwegian alpine skier, born in Oslo. He competed in slalom and giant slalom at the Winter Olympics in Cortina d'Ampezzo in 1956.

References

1933 births
2014 deaths
Alpine skiers at the 1956 Winter Olympics
Norwegian male alpine skiers
Olympic alpine skiers of Norway
Alpine skiers from Oslo